Foz do Iguaçu (Iguazu River Mouth) is the Brazilian city on the border of Iguaçu Falls. The city is the 7th largest in the state of Paraná. The city's population is approximately 258,000. It is approximately 650 km (400 mi) west of the capital of the state, Curitiba, being the westernmost city in that state.

The inhabitants of the city are known as iguaçuenses.

The city is characterized by tourism and cultural diversity. There are about 80 nationalities, being the most representative from Italy, Portugal, Lebanon, China, Paraguay and Argentina. Foz do Iguaçu is integrated into a tri-national region, bordering the Argentine city of Puerto Iguazú and the Paraguayan city of Ciudad del Este. The city's economy is based on tourism, with emphasis on trade and services.

According to research conducted by the Brazilian Tourist Institute (Embratur) and the Foundation Institute of Economic Research (FIFE) in 2006, 2007 and 2008, Foz do Iguaçu was the 2nd most visited leisure destination by foreign tourists after Rio de Janeiro. In 2010, it received from the Brazilian Ministry of Tourism 10 awards for Best Practices and Competitiveness Index. Foz do Iguaçu has been noted as a destination by various national and international media: the British newspaper The Guardian considered it the best foreign destination for the UK. The U.S. TV network CNN classified it as one of the 14 most romantic destinations.

Foz do Iguaçu is home of the Itaipu dam, the world's second largest hydroelectric plant in power generation, after the Three Gorges Dam in China. With 20 generator units and 14,000 MW of installed capacity, it provides approximately 15% of the energy consumed in Brazil and 86% of the energy consumed in Paraguay.
The city has a low crime rate by Brazilian standards.

Geography

Climate

The climate of Foz do Iguaçu is humid subtropical, with two distinctive seasons; one humid and hot in the summer and another, dry and cold, in the winter. The city's annual average temperature is 23.8 °C (74.8 °F), but can be as high as 40 °C (104 °F) in the summer (highest) or as low as -5 °C (23 °F) in the winter (lowest). The average in the summer is 26.5 °C (79.7 °F)and in the winter 15.4 °C (59.6 °F).

The climate of the city is hot or warm throughout the year, due to the relatively low altitude (standing only 173 m, above sea level).

Generally, the city is sunny during the year, but rain is fairly common during the spring and in the summer. The weather of the city, however, changes very constantly, because the region where the city stands is the zone where frequently three fronts meet. As consequence, it is not uncommon to see temperatures as high as 35 °C (95 °F) and in the summer as low as 8 °C (46 °F) in the city and frequent thunderstorms.

History 

In 1549, a Spanish explorer, Cabeza de Vaca, found the falls while travelling down the river. Very impressed, he named them "Quedas de Santa Maria". Later the name changed to Quedas del Iguazu; which was derived from the native name of the local Guarani Indians.

Until 1860, it was under the disputed territory between Brazil and Paraguay, but given the latter's defeat in the Paraguayan War, the falls were recognized as part of the Brazilian territory.

In 1910, the colony's status was upgraded to the position of "vila" (town or village), named "Vila Iguazu", and, in 1914, to city. At that time, the city was known as Foz do Iguassu.

In 1916, Alberto Santos-Dumont visited the region and, impressed with the beauty of the region, suggested more attention of the government to the area and asked for the appropriation of the land where currently is the Parque do Iguaçu (Iguaçu Park). Until 1917, this region had an owner, Jezus Val. The state appropriated the land in the next year, and, in 1939, the Parque Nacional do Iguaçu ("Iguaçu National Park") was created.

In 1945, an agreement between the Brazilian Academy of Letters and the Academy of Lisbon changed the city name to Foz do Iguaçu. The city experienced a big economical boom in the 1960s to the late 1980s, first with the construction of the Friendship Bridge, concluded in 1965, and the Itaipu Dam, in operation since in 1984.

On 19 October 2005, a proposal was made to adjust the city name to Foz do Iguassu. The proposal was approved in a first debate and then rejected in a second debate, at the Town Hall (Câmara Municipal), by four votes for and eight against. The bill was initiated by city councillor Djalma Pastorello, of the PSDB.

The purpose of the adjustment to the city name was to return the spelling to the original form, as at the foundation of the city in 1914. The change occurred due language reforms of 1945, which changed the orthography of Brazilian Portuguese. However, existing proper names were not obliged to change. Another reason for the proposed adjustment back to the original was that 146 of the 198 member countries of the United Nations do not have the "ç" character in their alphabets.

The adjustment would therefore rationalise any search for the city in search engines, since Foz do Iguaçu's is more widely known for the falls, which are known as the Iguassu Falls. Djalma Pastorello felt that tourism to the city of Foz do Iguaçu would be improved greatly by a clarification of its association with the now-famous Iguassu Falls. However, he estimated that 70% of the city's population were against the name change because the local media anticipated the change and presented it in a distorted way, so that locals were unable to see that the intention was to benefit the population.

Literature
The region that today is part of Foz do Iguaçu, is described by Álvar Núñez Cabeza de Vaca in his diary that narrates the very experience at the beginning of the European colonization in the Americas. In contemporary literature one of the city's neighborhoods appears in a subjective way in the work of the writer Leonid R. Bózio, who reports in the book Tempos Sombrios, from the series Autofagia, local mysticism through the figure of Pombero, creature of the Guarani Mythology.

Demographics

The city has a population of approximately 265,000, whilst the Tríplice Fronteira (Tri Frontier) region (Ciudad del Este, Hernandarias, Puerto Iguazú and the rural areas included within those municipalities) has a population of 820,000. The city's population is heterogeneous, with many immigrant communities, such as: Arabs, Chinese, Germans, Italians, Paraguayans, Argentines, French, Swedes, Portuguese and Ukrainians.

The residents are predominantly Roman Catholic but there is a relatively large minority of Muslims and Buddhists. The city has a large mosque and a Buddhist temple.

Fenartec is an annual event held in May to commemorate the city's multicultural diversity.

Source: Paranaense Institute for Economic and Social Development (2014)

Arab influence
Since 1940, Lebanese and other Arabs have settled in the southwestern city of Foz do Iguaçu, in the "Triple Border" area where Paraguay, Argentina and Brazil converge in a region of loosely controlled borders.

People of Lebanese heritage constitute around 90% of the population from Middle East in the city, with others from Egypt, Iraq, Jordan, Kuwait, Syria and Palestine.

Transportation 

Foz do Iguaçu is connected to the east by the BR-277, to Paranaguá, and to the west by the Friendship Bridge to Ciudad del Este, and to the south to Puerto Iguazú by the Fraternity Bridge. Both the BR-277 and the Friendship Bridge are very busy roads, linking Paraguay to the Paranaguá's seaport.

The city is served by the Foz do Iguaçu/Cataratas International Airport, which saw 1,155,615 passengers transit in 2010.

Public transport 
The city does not operate its own municipal transport networks, but instead licenses four private bus companies to operate services on its behalf. The bus fares are set by the municipality for all four companies. In 2003, the city initiated an integrated city fare and created a hub near the city centre.

Now, most of the bus routes pass through this hub and passengers pay a standard fare within the city zone, which enables them to transfer routes, even when these may be operated by another company.

The transport network extends to certain distant areas, such as the city's airport and the Iguazu Park, but not between the city and its neighbor Ciudad del Este, nor with Puerto Iguazú, which are serviced by other companies. These routes are not part of the integrated network, a situation reflected by higher fares.

Avenida Brasil (Brazil Avenue) 
Since Foz do Iguaçu's foundation, Brazil Avenue is the city's main road. While during its early years the street was primarily the military headquarters' location (now they are just in the right beginning of the Avenue), nowadays the street is a very active place where many retail stores are located. It is located at the downtown of the city and it is 5 km (3 mi) long (of which 3 km, is arterial road).

As of 2004, the prefecture of the city decided that a major revitalization of "Avenida Brasil" (Brazil Avenue) was needed. Attracting many consumers from many different areas of the city and even from its neighbours Ciudad del Este and Puerto Iguazú, the avenue, wide enough only to support two cars side-by-side, is frequently used during business days, and even more in important holidays (Christmas, Children's day, Easter, Mother's day), with many cars competing for a parking space.

The revitalization proposals asks for removal of parking space, giving major attention to pedestrians. Also, the avenue would be wide enough only to support one car side by side. The project started at the end of 2004, and by 2006 was completed. The avenue does not have a bus route, by municipal order.

Education

The city has a literacy rate of 95.5%, with most children attending public or private schools. Public education has been a priority of the municipality of the city and the government of the state of Paraná; however, most middle and upper-class families continue to send their children to elite private schools.

The city has approximately 30 private schools and approximately 120 public schools (including daycare and kindergarten schools). In addition, there are 7 universities: 
Cesufoz; 
UDC;
Uniamérica;
Unifoz; 
Unioeste; 
Anglo-Americano Faculdades;
IFPR (Technical Institute).

In January 2010, the Universidade Federal da Integração Latino-Americana (UNILA) was founded.

Tourism

The city is one of Brazil's most-frequented tourist destinations. Most tourists are Brazilians and Argentines. The city has about 100 hotels and inns. Its main attractions are:

Iguaçu Falls, which has a flow capacity equal to three times that of Niagara Falls. Part of the falls are on the Brazilian side. Others are on the Argentine side. "Devil's Throat" ( "Garganta do Diabo" in Portuguese) is the tallest of the falls, which is 97 m (318 ft) high;
Parque Nacional do Iguaçu (Iguaçu National Park), in both Brazil and Argentina, where the falls are. It is protected by the IBAMA;
Itaipu Dam, the first-largest generator of hydro-electric power in the world, in the Parana river, between Brazil and Paraguay;
The Tríplice Fronteira (Triple Frontier) location where Brazil, Argentina and Paraguay meet. Each side has its own Marco (landmark);
The Omar Ibn Al-Khattab mosque, the largest in Latin America;
The Bird Park (Parque das Aves), which features a collection of wild birds, and the "Bosque Guaraní" the city's zoo.

Sports
Foz do Iguaçu hosted an edition of the Summer X Games in 2013.

Notable people
Pepê, football player
Fabiano Beltrame, football player

See also
Ciudad del Este (A sister city of Foz do Iguaçu)
Puerto Iguazú
Itaipu Dam

References

External links

 Official site of the city.
Official site of the city.
 City Tourist Office 
Visit Foz do Iguaçu
Turismo em Foz do Iguaçu

 
Paraná River
Argentina–Brazil border crossings
Brazil–Paraguay border crossings